Boyan Tabakov (born on 2 February 1990) is a Bulgarian footballer.

Career

Levski
Tabakov came directly from Levski Sofia's Youth Academy. On 25 January 2008 Tabakov signed a three-year professional contract with Levski Sofia.

His first senior goal was on 27 February 2008, against Akademik Sofia, which was scored it at 64th minute. The match ended with a 3:0 result for Levski. His first official match was on 9 April 2008 against Marek Dupnitsa. Tabakov entered the match in the 54th minute, with a resulting 0:4 guest win for Levski.

On 10 September 2009 Tabakov started training with the first team. On the next day, he signed his new contract with Levski, connecting him with the team until 2013. He returned to Levski on 9 June 2010 after a short period on loan.

Lokomotiv Mezdra
On 11 January 2010, Tabakov was sent to Lokomotiv Mezdra on loan for six months. He returned to Levski on 9 June 2010.

Lyubimetz 2007
On 29 July 2010, Tabakov was sent to Lyubimetz 2007 on loan.

External links
 Tabakov at Levski2000

Bulgarian footballers
1990 births
Living people
PFC Levski Sofia players
PFC Lokomotiv Mezdra players
FC Lyubimets players
First Professional Football League (Bulgaria) players
Association football forwards
People from Haskovo
Sportspeople from Haskovo Province